Hans Bergsland (15 November 1878 – 9 June 1956) was a Norwegian fencer, sports official and businessperson.

He was born in Kristiania, was an older brother of Jacob Bergsland and represented the fencing club Kristiania FK. He competed at the 1908 (épée) and 1912 Summer Olympics (épée and team épée).

He finished his secondary education in 1897, took commercial education in Germany, France and England and the cand.philol. degree in 1901. From 1916 to 1922 he ran the company Peter Petersen & Co. He was the chief executive of Helsingborg Galoger and co-owner of Sandnes Kamgarn Spinneri. He was a supervisory council member of Livsforsikringsselskapet Fram and deputy member of Christiania Bank og Kreditkasse.

He was a member of Bærum municipal council, and was a board member of the municipal cinematographer. He chaired his own fencing club and the Norwegian Fencing Federation, and was a board member of the Norwegian Trekking Association. Among others, he worked with the 50 kilometre ski slope in Holmenkollen.

He received the King's Medal of Merit in gold and the Swedish Olympia Medal, and was decorated as a Chevalier of the Legion of Honour. He died in 1956.

References

External links
 

1878 births
1956 deaths
Sportspeople from Oslo
Norwegian male épée fencers
Fencers at the 1908 Summer Olympics
Fencers at the 1912 Summer Olympics
Olympic fencers of Norway
Norwegian sports executives and administrators
Bærum politicians
Norwegian sportsperson-politicians
Recipients of the King's Medal of Merit in gold
Chevaliers of the Légion d'honneur
Norwegian male foil fencers